Ian J. Tetley (born August 14, 1962) is a Canadian curler from Oakville, Ontario. He is a three-time Brier and World Champion.

Career
Tetley is originally from Thunder Bay, in Northern Ontario, which gets a separate team at the Brier. In 1985, he played second for Al Hackner, for which they won he won his first Brier, and World Championships, that same season. Tetley later moved to southern Ontario to play for second Ed Werenich. In 1990, Tetley won his second Brier, this time representing (southern) Ontario with Werenich. That team also won the World Championships. In 1994, he joined Wayne Middaugh's new rink, to play as his second. They won the Brier in 1998, and later Tetley picked up his third World Championship. The team made it to the Brier again in 2001, placing third. It would be Tetley's only Brier run that did not result in a world championship. In, 2003 he left the team. After playing for Mike Harris for one season, he was brought back to play for Middaugh before leaving for good in 2008 to play second for Peter Corner.
Tetley was named to Canadian Curling Hall of Fame in 1999.

Personal life
Ian's father Bill is also a former Brier champion (1975). Growing up Tetley was also a top junior skier. He is married to seven-time U.S. Champion Erika Brown. He has three children. Originally from Thunder Bay, Tetley moved to Toronto after graduating from Lakehead University.

References

External links
 
 "Tetley trying to keep perfect record intact

1962 births
Brier champions
Living people
Curlers from Thunder Bay
World curling champions
Canadian male curlers
Canadian curling coaches
Sportspeople from Oakville, Ontario
Curlers from Toronto
Lakehead University alumni
20th-century Canadian people